Creeden is a surname. Notable people with the surname include:

Connie Creeden (1915–1969), American baseball player
John B. Creeden (1871–1948), American Jesuit educator
Pat Creeden (1906–1992), American baseball player